The Malaysia International Film Festival (MIFFest) is a public exhibition showcasing international and local films in Malaysia. Accompanying this event is the Malaysia Golden Global Awards (MGGA) where the organisation Jazzy Group recognises filmmakers under their significant performances throughout the entire year. Both events were established in 2016. The mission of the MGGA is to let the enthusiasm and passionate filmmakers all around world to promote their films together and to let them to embrace freedom of film making while achieve their dreams.

Events
In 2021, Malaysia International Film Festival (MIFFest) organised a short film competition in partnership with vivo. A smartphone is required during the contest of the 5 minute short-film and the theme of the film is "Humanity".

Lists of the Ceremonies

Impact of the COVID-19 Pandemic
The 4th Malaysia International Film Festival (MIFFest) was postponed to 2021 without an annual awards ceremony. The Film Festival was held virtually in January 2021.

Malaysia Golden Global Awards (MGGA)

MGGA 2017

MGGA 2018

MGGA 2019

MGGA 2022
The 5th Miffest 2022 is a collaboration with the 24th Udine Far East Film Festival (FEFF) for the competition partnership this year. Both events intend to gain the milestone of making a bridge among the movie industries in the East and the West. The event took place from 10 to 15 July 2022, with the awards ceremony on 16 July 2022 at Istana Budaya, Kuala Lumpur.

Awards Categories
Current Categories:

The Best Film 最佳电影
The Best Director 最佳导演
The Best New Director 最佳新晋导演
The Best Actor 最佳男主角
The Best Actress 最佳女主角
The Best Supporting Actor 最佳男配角 (Since 2018)
The Best Supporting Actress 最佳女配角 (Since 2018)
The Best Screenplay 最佳编剧
The Best Cinematography 最佳摄影
Lifetime Achievement Award 终身成就奖
Audience Choice Award 观众票选奖
New Hope Award 人道主义奖 (Since 2018)

References

External links 

 

Malaysian film awards
Film festivals in Malaysia